Stephen Lewis Secondary School may refer to:

 Stephen Lewis Secondary School (Mississauga), in Mississauga, Ontario, Canada
 Stephen Lewis Secondary School (Vaughan), in Thornhill, Ontario, Canada